Mutsu to Nohohon is an action video game released in 2002 by Tomy. The game was only released in Japan. The game entails being a "mutsu" and swimming around your kingdom being which ever one you choose; either snow bunny, bear, hamster, or penguin.

The game has 12 levels, one for each month of the year. It received a score of 25/40 from Famitsu.

References

2002 video games
GameCube games
GameCube-only games
Action video games
Japan-exclusive video games
Tomy games
Video games developed in Japan
Single-player video games